Sleepy Creek Wildlife Management Area is located in Morgan and Berkeley Counties in West Virginia's Eastern Panhandle. The  Sleepy Creek Lake is located entirely within the WMA.

Location
To access Sleepy Creek WMA from Berkeley Springs, follow U.S. Route 522 south to Winchester Grade Road and follow Winchester Grade Road  to Shanghai Road. Follow east on Shanghai Road into the WMA. Follow Sleepy Creek Road west into the WMA.

Recreation
Hunting opportunities in Sleepy Creek WMA include white-tailed deer,  ruffed grouse, eastern gray squirrel, and wild turkey. Trapping opportunities can include  bobcat, red fox, and raccoon.

Fishing opportunities in the  Sleepy Creek Lake include largemouth bass, bluegill, crappie, and northern pike.

Seventy-five primitive camping sites are provided at the WMA. Trailers over  feet long should not be brought into the WMA due to the narrow gravel access road.

See also

List of West Virginia wildlife management areas

References

External links
West Virginia DNR District 2 Wildlife Management Areas
West Virginia Hunting Regulations
West Virginia Fishing Regulations

Wildlife management areas of West Virginia
Protected areas of Berkeley County, West Virginia
Protected areas of Morgan County, West Virginia
IUCN Category V